Glendale Park Historic District is a national historic district located at Hammond, Lake County, Indiana.   The district encompasses 13 contributing buildings and 1 contributing site in an exclusively residential section of Hammond. It developed between about 1905 and 1926, and includes notable example of Colonial Revival, Tudor Revival, Prairie School and Bungalow / American Craftsman styles of residential architecture. The houses are arranged along a parkway with Glendale Park in the center.

It was listed in the National Register of Historic Places in 2013.

References

Historic districts on the National Register of Historic Places in Indiana
Colonial Revival architecture in Indiana
Tudor Revival architecture in Indiana
Prairie School architecture in Indiana
Historic districts in Hammond, Indiana
National Register of Historic Places in Lake County, Indiana